Nurabad (also Romanized as Nūrābād) is a village in Hoseynabad Rural District, Esmaili District, Anbarabad County, Kerman Province, Iran. At the 2006 census, its population was 295, in 57 families.

References 

Populated places in Anbarabad County